Ilanga undata is a species of sea snail, a marine gastropod mollusk in the family Solariellidae.

Subspecies
 Ilanga undata sphinx Herbert, 1987
 Ilanga undata undata (G. B. Sowerby II, 1870)

Description
The height of the shell attains 9 mm, its diameter 15 mm. The depressed, pale reddish or fawn shell is perforated with a round umbilicus up to the apex. It is faintly spirally lirate and angulated almost above the suture. It is rounded-angular at the middle of the keel. The corners are red-stained. The interstices show red waving lines.

Distribution
This marine species occurs off the Agulhas Bank to the West Cape Province, South Africa

References

 Thiele J. (1925). Gastropoden der Deutschen Tiefsee-Expedition. II Teil. Wissenschaftliche Ergebnisse der Deutschen Tiefsee-Expedition auf dem Dampfer "Valdivia" 1898-1899. 17(2): 35-382, pls 13-46

External links
 Adams, A. & Reeve, L. A. (1848-1850). Mollusca. In A. Adams (ed.), The zoology of the voyage of H.M.S. Samarang, under the command of Captain Sir Edward Belcher, C.B., F.R.A.S., F.G.S., during the years 1843-1846. Reeve & Benham, London, x + 87 pp., 24 pls. 
 G.B. Sowerby (1870), Descriptions of forty-eight new Species of Shells; Proceedings of the Zoological Society of London
 K.H. Barnard, Contributions to the knowledge of South African marine Mollusca. Part IV. Gastropoda : Prosobranchiata; Annals of the South African Museum v. 47 (1963-1974) p. 236-237
 Herbert D.G. (2015). An annotated catalogue and bibliography of the taxonomy, synonymy and distribution of the Recent Vetigastropoda of South Africa (Mollusca). Zootaxa. 4049(1): 1-98.
 To World Register of Marine Species
 Gastropods.com: Ilanga undata undata

Endemic fauna of South Africa
bicarinata
Gastropods described in 1870